Sergei Tretyakov may refer to:

 Sergei Tretyakov (arts patron) (1834–1892), Russian philanthropist
 Sergei Tretyakov (writer) (1892–1937), Russian writer
 Sergei Tretyakov (intelligence officer) (1956–2010), Russian who defected to the United States 
 Sergei Tretyakov (scientist), Russian-Finnish scientist